1991 Dakar Rally also known as the 1991 Paris–Dakar Rally was the 13th running of the Dakar Rally event. The rally was won by 1981 world rally champion, Ari Vatanen, for the third successive time and for the fourth time in five years. Stephane Peterhansel won the motorcycle category.

References

Dakar Rally
Paris
1991 in French motorsport
1991 in African sport